Ophioglossolambis violacea is a species of large sea snail, a marine gastropod mollusk in the family Strombidae family, the true conchs and their allies.

Distribution
This species is endemic to Mauritius, the Mascarene basin and Réunion.

References

 Walls, J.G. (1980). Conchs, tibias and harps. A survey of the molluscan families Strombidae and Harpidae. T.F.H. Publications Ltd, Hong Kong.
 Rosenberg, G. 1992. Encyclopedia of Seashells. Dorset: New York. 224 pp. page(s): 64
 Dekkers A.M. (2012) A new genus related to the genus Lambis Röding, 1798 (Gastropoda: Strombidae) from the Indian Ocean. Gloria Maris 51(2-3): 68-74. [8 April 2012; title page erroneously dated 11 March]

Strombidae
Gastropods described in 1821
Endemic fauna of Mauritius
Taxonomy articles created by Polbot